Adelaide Olympic F.C. is a football club from Adelaide, South Australia. The club competes in the National Premier Leagues South Australia.

Origins
The club's origins can first be traced back to 1978, where it was founded under the name of Adelaide Asteras. 

In 1982 the club changed its name to Thebarton Asteras. Six years later, the club was taken over by the Greek Orthodox association of South Australia Inc. who later changed its name to Olympians in 1989.

In 1998, the Greek Orthodox Association of South Australia Inc relinquished the Olympians soccer Club, which amalgamated with SAASL Club "Adelaide Rodos Soccer Club", while keeping the playing name of Olympians.

In 1999 Olympians amalgamated with the Regency Lions Sports and Social Club (SAASL Playing Name :Adelaide Hellenic Soccer Club).

In 2000, the name was changed to Olympic Football Club. In 2001, the club adopted its current name of Adelaide Olympic.

Club history

The Early Years 

The club played its first games as Adelaide Asteras in 1979 in the sixth division of the Amateur league. Its initial home games were played at Woodville West, and the club won the division amassing 104 goals – including a 15–0 victory over West End United.

In 1981, the club joined the SASF Metro League and won the league in its first season. They were promoted to the 2nd division, finished last and relegated back to the Metro League in 1982. In 1983, the club finished second and was promoted back up to the second division. The club struggled in the second division for the next eight years. 

In 1992, Olympians dominated the second division finishing seven points clear at the top of the table and were promoted to the 1st division. In the same year the club won the top four play-off finals.  The topsy turvy path continued over the coming years, which included the club being relegated back to the second division in 1994 (as a result of failing to meet new FFSA requirements, not because of results with the club finishing 8th in the ten team league), returning to the Premier League in 1996, dropping to the 2nd division in 2000 and finally returning to the Premier League in 2001. 

The 2000s

The 2004 Premier League season was without a doubt the club's best year in terms of on-field performance. The club earned 2nd spot on the Premier League table and played in the grand final against Metro Stars eventually losing 2–1 after leading 0–1. Adelaide Olympic then continued with another good year in 2005 once again finishing second on the Premier League table and making the finals again however they lost to eventual champions Adelaide City in the semi-final.

Following the loss of several key and experienced players, Adelaide Olympic was relegated at the end of the 2006 season. Seasons 2007, '08, and '09 were spent languishing mid-table in the second division and a massive amount of debt being accumulated.

During the end of the 2009 season a number of key figures within the Adelaide Greek community joined forces to rescue Adelaide Olympic and return the club to the first tier of football. A new board was elected and got on with job of sorting out the club's finances. Former Socceroo Branko Milosevic was appointed as first team coach and number of former players returned to the club as it sought to  challenge for promotion into the first division. 

The 2010s

In 2011, Adelaide Olympic became the sole tenant of Ferryden Park Reserve which has become affectionately known as "Olympic Park". 2011 also saw the arrival of many talented young players to the u/19 squad providing strong competition to the Reserve & First team squads eventually winning titles amongst the younger brigade. The first team finished 5th only just losing the second promotion spot into the Super League to Enfield City 2–1 in the semi-final of the play-offs.

The 2012 season started with the appointment of Reserve team coach Shane Porter to the First team position however due to player discontent and a poor start to the season the board decided to part ways with Shane Porter and moved quickly to appoint former Blue Eagles coach Zoran Karadzic. Following a disappointing season, Adelaide Olympic later announced the appointment of former Olympians player and U18 coach George Konstandopoulos as First team coach for the coming 2013 season. 

The appointment was primarily due to his successful work as the U18 coach and the club's expressed desire to promote youth. Despite to achieving promotion, the 2013 season was deemed successful given that many youth players were promoted to the first team with the lowest average age in a single game being 18.3yo. Many of these players were later selected to join Adelaide United in their youth development, and have gone on to play in the Hyundai A-League.

Season 2014 started with a continued focus on youth however eight rounds into the season, Adelaide Olympic parted ways with George Konstandopoulos. Branko Milosevic was appointed to the first team coaching position for the remainder of the season. The club finished in 5th position and made the play-offs, falling agonisingly short to Modbury away in the Semi-final. 

The Campaign Towards Promotion in 2015

Preparations for 2015 commenced the day after  with key figures involved at the club coming together to plan how Olympic was going to be promoted. A key appointment was the former Scottish Premier League star Alby Kidd to senior role with Branko Milosevic alongside. A slow start to the season looked daunting but a quick change of some personnel in the team sent the team on a winning spree for months with the team beating Adelaide Victory 2–3 to achieve top spot. Top goalscorer and Italian import Fausto Erba was to thank for most of Olympic's goals that season. 

In the middle of the second half of the season, Olympic went into another slump only claiming 1 point in a month of playing sending the team as far back as 5th. Promotion looked lost, but once again the team rallied up and wasn't yet done and won the next 7 games. The last game at Noarlunga finished 2–4 in a win, but the result of promotion, play-off or nothing relied on Cumberland United vs Adelaide Hills & Adelaide United vs Adelaide Victory. The latter game finished 12–3 in United's favour, guaranteeing United a top-2 spot and Cumberland United were winning 2–0 at 89' minutes against a 10-man Adelaide Hills. All looked lost and the team began their goodbyes and congratulations to retiring players when a lifelong supporter burst into the change room announcing & screaming it was 2–2 at the Cumberland United vs Adelaide Hills game. 2 extra time goals took away not only promotion for Cumberland, but the State League Title and gave Adelaide Olympic one more chance for promotion. Olympic were sent into raptures. 

Adelaide Olympic were to play two legs (home and away) against long-time rivals Port Pirates. A 1–1 draw at home with both sides looking dangerous gave Pirates an away goal advantage however the 2nd leg would be remembered forever. Adelaide Olympic rolled up to the Pirate Park with no intention less than winning and getting promoted. Even after James Dimopoulos, vice-captain was sent off, and a repeat of last season looked imminent, Adelaide Olympic turned that on its head. A power drive into the bottom corner from Sean Brennan gave Olympic the 0–1 and Pirates' away goal counted for nothing. With a spot-kick from Fausto Erba, it gave a 0–2 lead to Olympic at half time. With only another 45 minutes to play till promotion, Olympic didn't stop there. Arguably the goal of the season across all leagues was scored by Oliver Totani after turning four Pirates players inside out and curling the ball just under the apex leaving the keeper helpless, gave Olympic a 0–3 lead. Erba would again nail the coffin shut sending Pirates back down to the State League with a converted one-on-one with the keeper making it 0–4. After 10 years, Adelaide Olympic returned to the Premier League.

From 2016 onwards, Adelaide Olympic has cemented its place within the first tier of football within South Australia, the National Premier League. 

On 22 June 2019, Olympic qualified for the Round of 32 of the FFA Cup for the first time by beating Adelaide City 3–2 in the FFSA Federation Cup final.  They advanced to the Round of 16 by defeating Floreat Athena 4–3 with Fausto Erba and Ioannis Simosis scoring twice each.

Current squad

Notable former players 
 Robert Cornthwaite
 Bruce Kamau
 Nathan Konstandopoulos
 Branko Milosevic
 Paul Pezos
 Ruon Tongyik
 Michael Valkanis
 Kristi Vangjeli
 Evan Kostopoulos

Affiliated clubs 
 PAOK FC – Olympic developed a partnership with Super League Greece club PAOK FC which was announced on 11 July 2019. The partnership allows the exchange of coaches between the two clubs and for Olympic youth to participate in PAOK youth tournaments.

References

External links
Official Website
Official Twitter
Official Facebook Page

Oly
Soccer clubs in South Australia
Association football clubs established in 1978
1978 establishments in Australia
Greek-Australian culture
Diaspora sports clubs in Australia